The fourteenth season of the American television series Whose Line Is It Anyway? premiered on The CW on June 4, 2018, and concluded on October 1, 2018.

Cast

Recurring  
 Jeff Davis (five episodes)
 Greg Proops (four episodes)
 Gary Anthony Williams (three episodes)
 Jonathan Mangum (two episodes)
 Keegan-Michael Key (one episode)
 Heather Anne Campbell (one episode)
 Brad Sherwood (one episode)

Special Guest 
 Charles "Chip" Esten (one episode)

Episodes 

"Winner(s)" of each episode as chosen by host Aisha Tyler are highlighted in italics. The winner(s) perform a sketch during the credit roll, just like in the original UK series.

References

External links
Whose Line Is It Anyway? (U.S.) (a Titles & Air Dates Guide)
Mark's guide to Whose Line is it Anyway? - Episode Guide

Whose Line Is It Anyway?
2018 American television seasons